Hamilton Theatre Inc. (or HTI, as it is often abbreviated) provides Hamilton area audiences with "The Best of Broadway," offering the surrounding community an opportunity to get involved in all aspects of musical theatre. They also provide a quality training ground for individuals wishing to move on to professional theatre.

Their productions have taken place at the Palace Theatre, Westdale Secondary School, Mohawk College, Sir John A. Macdonald Secondary School, FirstOntario Concert Hall, the Hamilton Downtown Arts Centre, and at its own studio theatre.

History
Hamilton Theatre Company began in 1956. Credited with forming the company were eight members of the "Gilbert & Sullivan" Company who left that group to produce newer and more contemporary musical comedies. Incorporated in 1959, Hamilton Theatre Inc. functioned from a former fire hall that was renovated and augmented at Strathcona and Head Streets until 1986. After four years and 5000 hours of volunteer work by its members, the present home at 140 MacNab Street North was completed.

Since its beginning, when it took $3,000 to finance the first production, HTI has produced over 100 Broadway musicals. Some with budgets over $60,000, financed solely by ticket sales and fundraisers.

Former members
Former members include Timothy J. Alex, Nick Cordero, Jason Jones, Kathleen Robertson, Steve Weston, Jim Witter, Jim White, and Lou Zamprogna.

Shows

References

Theatre companies in Ontario
Music of Hamilton, Ontario
Organizations based in Hamilton, Ontario
Musical theatre companies
Organizations established in 1956
1956 establishments in Ontario